Boone Township is one of nine townships in Crawford County, Indiana. As of the 2010 census, its population was 175 and it contained 124 housing units.

Geography

Cities and towns
 Alton

Unincorporated towns
 Deuchars
(This list is based on USGS data and may include former settlements.)

Adjacent townships
 Ohio Township (northeast)
 Union Township, Perry County (southwest)
 Oil Township, Perry County (west)

Cemeteries
The township contains five cemeteries: Birds, Orchard Hill, Riddle, Sheckell and Burnside.

References
 
 United States Census Bureau cartographic boundary files

External links

 Indiana Township Association
 United Township Association of Indiana

Townships in Crawford County, Indiana
Townships in Indiana